Bukovica is a village in the Municipality of Škofja Loka in the Upper Carniola region of Slovenia.

Name
Bukovica was attested in written sources in 1291 as Bukkebitz (and as Bukkawitz in 1318 and Wukawicz in 1485). Bukovica is a common toponym and oronym in Slovenia. It is derived from the adjective bukov 'beech' (from bukev 'beech tree') and originally referred to the local vegetation. In the past the German name was Wukouza.

Church

The local church is dedicated to Saint Florian.

References

External links 

Bukovica at Geopedia

Populated places in the Municipality of Škofja Loka